Zevallos is a settlement in Guadeloupe in the commune of Le Moule, on the island of Grande-Terre. Gardel and Renard are to its west; to its north is Conchou, and to its east are Guillot and Vezoux.

References 

Populated places in Guadeloupe